Camillo Pasquali (8 January 1909 – 27 February 1956) was an Italian politician who served as Mayor of Novara for two terms (1946–1947, 1949–1951) and as Senator from 1953 to 1956.

References

1909 births
1956 deaths
Mayors of Novara
Senators of Legislature II of Italy
20th-century Italian politicians
Italian Socialist Party politicians
People from Novara